Wuiswell Isea Fernández is a Venezuelan association footballer for Dominican First Division club Atlético Pantoja. He previously played for Atlántico FC.

Club career

International career
He earned only one international cap for Venezuela in 2002 in a friendly against Ecuador as a substitute.

References

External links
 
 

1982 births
Living people
People from Caracas
Venezuelan footballers
Venezuela international footballers
USM Alger players
Caracas FC players
Deportivo Miranda F.C. players
Aragua FC players
Zulia F.C. players
Atlético Huila footballers
Portuguesa F.C. players
Carabobo F.C. players
Sportivo Trinidense footballers
Trujillanos FC players
Metropolitanos FC players
Venezuelan Primera División players
Categoría Primera A players
Liga Dominicana de Fútbol players
Venezuelan expatriate footballers
Expatriate footballers in the Dominican Republic
Expatriate footballers in Algeria
Expatriate footballers in Colombia
Expatriate footballers in Paraguay
Venezuelan expatriate sportspeople in the Dominican Republic
Venezuelan expatriate sportspeople in Algeria
Venezuelan expatriate sportspeople in Colombia
Venezuelan expatriate sportspeople in Paraguay
Association football midfielders